This is a list of level editors for video games. Level editors allow for the customization and modification of levels within games.

Official or single games

Generic 
Gamestudio a commercial level editor for the gamestudio engine
Grome by Quad Software
GtkRadiant by id Software, Loki Software, Infinity Ward, and Treyarch
Future Pinball - A pinball editor.
QuArK, Quake Army Knife editor, for a variety of engines (such as Quake III Arena, Half-Life, Source engine games, Torque, etc.)
Quiver (level editor), a level editor for the original Quake engine developed solely for the Classic Macintosh Operating System by Scott Kevill, who is also the developer and administrator of GameRanger
Tile Studio general purpose sprite/level editor for game programmers
Visual Pinball
Stencyl includes a Scene Designer module which is used to place tiles, actors, and assign behaviors and settings.

References 

 
Level editors